G-MAC or G-Mac may refer to:

 G-MAC: Great Midwest Athletic Conference, United States
 G-Mac: Graham McDowell, golfer